Aeonium dodrantale is a species of tree houseleek in the family Crassulaceae.

Systematics

The first description as Sempervivum dodrantale by Carl Ludwig von Willdenow was published in 1809. Theodorus Hendrikus Maria Mes put the species in 1995 in the genus Aeonium.

A synonym in nomenclature is Greenovia dodrantalis (Willd.) Webb & Berthel. (1841).

Description 

The species grows as a perennial, densely budding rosette plant, the offshoot of 2 to 8 inches long thin, smooth stem forms. The cup-shaped or urn-shaped rosettes reach a diameter of 3 to 6 centimeters and are tightly closed during the dry season. Their leaves are tightly packed during growth. The obovate-spateligen, pale green, bluish breath, initially with very fine mesh, later bare leaves are 2 to 3.5 centimetres long, 1 to 1.5 centimeters wide and 0.1 to 0.2 centimeters thick. Towards the top they are rounded or truncated and are often finished. The base is broadly wedge-shaped or slightly narrowed. The leaf margin is translucent.

The flattened inflorescence has a length of 3 to 6 centimeters and a width of 5 to 10 centimeters. The densely leafed peduncle is 10 to 25 centimeters long. The 18 to 23-fold flowers are on a 2 to 4 millimeters long, glandular-fluffy flower stem. The sepals are glandular-fluffy. The deep yellow, reverse lanceolate petals are 6 to 7 millimeters long and 1 to 1.5 millimeters wide. The stamens are bare.

Distribution 
Aeonium dodrantale is widespread in the east and west of Tenerife at heights of 150 to 1200 meters.

References 

Aeonium